The 2019 Caribbean Premier League (CPLT20) or for sponsorship reasons, Hero CPL 2019 was the seventh season of the Caribbean Premier League, the domestic Twenty20 cricket league in the West Indies. Matches were played in six countries – Trinidad and Tobago, Saint Kitts and Nevis, Guyana, Barbados, Jamaica and Saint Lucia. Originally, the tournament was scheduled to start on 21 August 2019. However, this was pushed back to 4 September 2019, to avoid clashing with India's tour to the West Indies.

In August 2019, the St Lucia Stars franchise team was axed from the tournament, with the CPL looking to replace the team. They were later replaced by the returning St Lucia Zouks franchise.

The Barbados Tridents won the tournament, claiming their second CPL title, after beating the Guyana Amazon Warriors by 27 runs in the final.

Squads
The following players were selected for the tournament:

Points table

 Last Update: 4 October 2019.
 Top four teams advanced to the Playoffs
  advanced to the Qualifier 1
  advanced to the Eliminator

League progression

League stage

Fixtures
The complete fixture was released on 28 May 2019. All times are in the respective local times.

Playoffs

Eliminator

Qualifier 1

Qualifier 2

Final

Statistics

Most runs

 Source: Cricinfo

Most wickets

 Source: Cricinfo

References

External links
 Series home at ESPN Cricinfo 

Caribbean Premier League 
Caribbean Premier League